Ilya Somin (born 1973) is a law professor at George Mason University, B. Kenneth Simon Chair in Constitutional Studies at the Cato Institute, a blogger for the Volokh Conspiracy, and a former co-editor of the Supreme Court Economic Review (2006–2013). His research focuses on constitutional law, property law, migration rights, and the study of popular political participation and its implications for constitutional democracy.

He is the author of Free to Move: Foot Voting, Migration, and Political Freedom (Oxford University Press, 2020), Democracy and Political Ignorance: Why Smaller Government Is Smarter, The Grasping Hand: "Kelo v. City of New London" and the Limits of Eminent Domain and A Conspiracy Against Obamacare: The Volokh Conspiracy and the Health Care Case (co-authored with other Volokh Conspiracy bloggers). A revised and expanded second edition of Democracy and Political Ignorance came out in June 2016. He is also the author of two books about property rights and eminent domain: The Grasping Hand: "Kelo v. City of New London" and the Limits of Eminent Domain (University of Chicago Press, revised edition, 2016), a book on the topic of eminent domain, takings and the US Supreme Court's controversial decision in Kelo v. City of New London, and Eminent Domain: A Comparative Perspective (Cambridge University Press, 2017), co-edited with Hojun Lee and Iljoong Kim.

Personal life
Somin was born to Jewish parents in the USSR in 1973. At age five, he emigrated along with his family to the United States. In a personal memoir, Somin recounted both the material poverty in the USSR (that he experienced firsthand) and the ideological indoctrination (that he learned about from family members, and saw glimpses of as a child). Somin received his B.A. in political science and history from Amherst College, M.A. in political science from Harvard University and J.D. from Yale Law School.

Views

Political ignorance
Like other public choice theorists, Somin argues that rational ignorance is a major problem for the successful functioning of democracy. He has argued for this position in a number of published articles, and has in particular been critical of the ideal of deliberative democracy.

Somin notes that rational irrationality, as described by Bryan Caplan in The Myth of the Rational Voter, is a problem. Somin departs from traditional public choice theorists by carving out an important place for rational irrationality, while at the same time disagreeing with Caplan's assertion that rational ignorance alone would not be a problem.

Somin's book Democracy and Political Ignorance: Why Smaller Government is Smarter elaborates on this thesis. He also defended the theory in the lead essay of Cato Unbound in October 2013. Other participants in the exchange included Heather Gerken, Jeffrey Friedman, and Sean Trende. Gerken's response essay used the fox versus hedgehog distinction, arguing that Somin's ideal voter was a fox, whereas David Schleicher's work stressed that voters tended to be hedgehogs and use their party affiliation as an informational shortcut. Political commentator George Will reviewed the book favorably in a Washington Post op-ed.

Somin's work on political ignorance stretches back some 15 years before the publication of Democracy and Political Ignorance. He published a much-cited article on political ignorance in the interdisciplinary journal Critical Review in 1998. In 2004, he wrote a policy analysis for the Cato Institute titled "When Ignorance Isn't Bliss: How Political Ignorance Threatens Democracy" that laid out the case he would elaborate in his book. In 2010, he wrote a critique of deliberative democracy based on his research on political ignorance.

Somin's work on political ignorance has been covered by media around the world, including Washington Post columnist George Will and the Chicago Tribune.

Originalism
Somin is a proponent of originalism: he argues that judges should interpret the Constitution according to its original public meaning. Somin has written an article about the relationship and tension between constitutional originalism and political ignorance. He has also blogged about the history of originalism, the relation between originalism and discrimination, the relation between originalism and affirmative action, and other topics related to originalism.

Property rights
Somin has been critical of eminent domain laws that permit governments to take over land by force. He was critical of the court decision in Kelo v. City of New London and has defended eminent domain reforms undertaken by US states in the wake of the incident, while arguing that such reforms may not go far enough in protecting private property rights. Somin has argued that Detroit's abuse of eminent domain "deter[red] investment by undermining confidence in the security of property rights." Somin's book on the topic of property rights and eminent domain, titled The Grasping Hand: "Kelo v. City of New London" and the Limits of Eminent Domain was published by the University of Chicago Press and released on June 15, 2015. Many commentators consider it the leading work on the controversial Kelo case, and  "public use" restrictions on takings. The book was described as the definitive analysis and critique of Kelo by leading legal scholars Richard Epstein and James Krier, and also endorsed by attorneys for both sides in the case.

Author
Ilya Somin's latest book is Free to Move: Foot Voting, Migration, and Political Freedom (Oxford University Press, 2020). It argues for expanding opportunities for people to "vote with their feet" both domestically and through international migration.

Somin is the author of Democracy and Political Ignorance: Why Smaller Government Is Smarter, published by Stanford University Press) in 2013. A revised second edition was published in 2016. In the book, Somin expands on his public choice-style case for limited government.

Somin's book The Grasping Hand: "Kelo v. City of New London" and the Limits of Eminent Domain expands on his work on eminent domain and property rights, and was published in June 2015 by the University of Chicago Press.

Somin is the co-author, along with other Volokh Conspiracy bloggers, of the book A Conspiracy Against Obamacare: The Volokh Conspiracy and the Health Care Case. Somin's co-authors include Randy Barnett, Jonathan H. Adler, David Bernstein, Orin Kerr, and David Kopel. Trevor Burrus is the editor.

He is also co-editor of Eminent Domain in Comparative Perspective, published by Cambridge University Press in 2017.

Contributing to the anthology Our American Story (2019), Somin addressed the possibility of a shared American narrative and built on his prior themes surrounding "foot voting" through immigration, both internally between subnational jurisdictions as well as immigration from other countries.

Congressional testimony
Somin has testified to the United States Congress twice: once on the subject of drone warfare and once on the subject of Sonia Sotomayor's record on property rights, in connection with her nomination as a justice for the Supreme Court.

Media
Somin has participated many times in the New York Times Room for Debate Forum.

Somin's articles have been published by a number of mainstream news and opinion outlets in the United States including The New York Times, Washington Post, The Wall Street Journal, USA Today, CNN,  National Review, Forbes, Los Angeles Times, and others.

Somin's blog posts at Volokh Conspiracy have been cited in many mainstream news outlets. Somin's blog post about the Supreme Court decision in Fisher v. University of Texas was cited by a number of news outlets. Blog posts by Ilya Somin about the Supreme Court's decisions related to gay marriage (specifically, decisions about the Defense of Marriage Act and California Proposition 8 made in June 2013) were also widely cited.

References

External links 

 
 

1973 births
Living people
American people of Russian-Jewish descent
Amherst College alumni
Cato Institute people
Jewish American academics
Soviet emigrants to the United States
Soviet Jews
George Mason University School of Law faculty
Harvard University alumni
Yale Law School alumni
21st-century American Jews